
Gmina Skarżysko Kościelne is a rural gmina (administrative district) in Skarżysko County, Świętokrzyskie Voivodeship, in south-central Poland.

Villages
Gmina Skarżysko Kościelne contains the villages and settlements of Grzybowa Góra, Kierz Niedźwiedzi, Lipowe Pole Plebańskie, Lipowe Pole Skarbowe, Majków, Michałów, Skarżysko Kościelne and Świerczek.

Neighbouring gminas
Gmina Skarżysko Kościelne is bordered by the town of Skarżysko-Kamienna and by the gminas of Mirów, Mirzec, Szydłowiec and Wąchock.

References
Polish official population figures 2006

Skarzysko Koscielne
Skarżysko County